Tomas Oral (born 24 April 1973) is a German football manager for SV Sandhausen.

Managerial career

Early career (2006–2011)
Oral was hired as head coach for FSV Frankfurt prior to the 2006–07 season. His debut was a 2–0 win against 1. FC Schwalmstadt in the Hessenliga. He would finish the season in first place; losing only one match. The only loss of the season came on matchday 30 against Viktoria Aschaffenburg. The club's first-place finish meant promotion to the Regionalliga Süd. During the 2007–08 season, Frankfurt defeated the reserve team of 1860 München, drew against the reserve team of Bayern Munich, and recorded a pair of draws against the reserve team of VfB Stuttgart. Again, Frankfurt finished in first place and were promoted. During the 2008–09 season, Frankfurt played in the 2. Bundesliga and German Cup. Frankfurt started the season with a 2–0 win against VfL Osnabrück in the German Cup. However, they went winless in their first four league matches of the season. They were knocked out of the German Cup in the second round after losing 1–0 to Carl Zeiss Jena. Frankfurt finished the season in 15th place; two points above the relegation playoff spot. To start the 2009–10 season, Frankfurt was knocked out of the German Cup by Borussia Mönchengladbach. Oral resigned on 5 October 2009. Frankfurt were in 17th place at the time of his resignation. He finished with a record of 53 wins, 31 draws, and 29 losses.

Oral was head coach of RB Leipzig between 18 June 2010 and 28 May 2011. Leipzig started the season with a nine–match undefeated streak. He finished the season in fourth place. He finished with a record of 18 wins, 10 draws, and six losses.

2011–2016
Oral was hired on 10 November 2011. His first match was a 1–0 loss to 1860 Munich on 18 November 2011. He would go on to win only one of his first eight matches as the new head coach. The only win during that stretch was against FC St. Pauli. However, starting from that victory, Ingolstadt went on a 14–match undefeated streak which included wins over Hansa Rostock, SC Paderborn 07, VfL Bochum, and Karlsruher SC. The streak ended after a 4–1 loss to 1860 Munich. Ingolstadt finished the 2011–12 season in 12th place. The following season, Ingolstadt finished in 13th place. Oral and Ingolstadt parted ways as of 30 June 2013. His final match was a 3–0 loss to 1. FC Köln on 19 May 2013. He finished with a record of 16 wins, 22 draws, and 17 losses.

On 18 May 2015, Oral replaced Benno Möhlmann with a match left in the 2014–15 season. Frankfurt was in 16th place when Oral was hired. The match against 1. FC Kaiserslautern finished in a 1–1 draw and Frankfurt jumped up to 13th place. During the 2015–16 season, Frankfurt defeated Dynamo Berlin and lost to Hertha BSC in the German Cup. In the league, Frankfut started the season with a three–match winless streak. Frankfurt results were mixed up to the winter break. Frankfurt lost to Arminia Bielefeld on matchday 19, immediately prior to the winter break. At this point, Frankfurt dropped down to 14th place in the league table. He was sacked on 10 April 2016 after losing 4–1 to VfL Bochum. Frankfurt were in 14th place when he was sacked. He finished with a record of nine wins, eight draws, and 15 losses.

Oral was appointed on 8 March 2016 for the start of the 2016–17 season as the head coach of Karlsruher SC. His first match was a 0–0 draw against Arminia Bielefeld on 7 August 2016. Oral was sacked on 4 December 2016. His final match was a 2–1 loss to Greuther Fürth on 2 December 2016. Karlsruhe were in 16th place at the time Oral was sacked. Oral finished with a record of two wins, six draws, and eight losses.

2019
He returned to Ingolstadt on 3 April 2019. After the season, Oral left Ingolstadt.

2020
On 11 March 2020, he once again returned to Ingolstadt. Even though they got promoted to the 2. Bundesliga, his contract was not renewed for the 2021–22 season.

2023
In February 2023, he was named the new head coach of SV Sandhausen.

Managerial record

References

External links

1973 births
Living people
FSV Frankfurt players
German football managers
German people of Turkish descent
People from Ochsenfurt
Sportspeople from Lower Franconia
FSV Frankfurt managers
RB Leipzig managers
FC Ingolstadt 04 managers
SV Sandhausen managers
Fulham F.C. non-playing staff
2. Bundesliga managers
3. Liga managers
Association football midfielders
Footballers from Bavaria
German footballers
Viktoria Aschaffenburg players
Karlsruher SC managers